State Route 184 (SR 184), locally known as Weedpatch Highway, is a state highway in the U.S. state of California. Located in Kern County, it runs from the intersection of SR 223 (Bear Mountain Boulevard) and Wheeler Ridge Road near Arvin north to SR 178 in Bakersfield. It is mainly a 2-lane conventional highway, expanding to four lanes in Lamont and Bakersfield. The highway serves local agricultural land south of Bakersfield.

Route description
SR 184 starts at the intersection of SR 223 (Bear Mountain Boulevard) and Wheeler Ridge Road. The latter is a county road that, although not a truck route, is the only north/south road south of Bakersfield that directly connects to I-5. SR 223 provides a connection from I-5 to Arvin.

SR 184 then travels north, through relatively flat agricultural land. It crosses through the towns of Weedpatch, and Lamont. The highway continues north, and crosses its major junction with SR 58, a major east/west freeway that connects the San Joaquin Valley to all points southeast. At the junction, the road’s name changes to Morning Drive. It then enters the rural, but growing, eastern portion of Bakersfield. At the intersection of Morning Drive and Niles Street/Kern Canyon Road, the route turns right onto Kern Canyon Road. The route turns northeast, as it travels through open grassland. It terminates at SR 178 (Kern Canyon Road) near the old Mesa Marin Raceway. SR 178 runs from Bakersfield to the Kern Valley region.

SR 184 is part of the California Freeway and Expressway System, and is part of the National Highway System, a network of highways that are considered essential to the country's economy, defense, and mobility by the Federal Highway Administration.

History
SR 184 was adopted as a state route in 1933 as Legislative Route 143. It was an unsigned highway running from LRN 140 (current SR 223, Bear Mountain Boulevard), to LRN 57 (current SR 178, Kern Canyon Rd.). The route definition has changed little since that time. In 1964, during the renumbering of California routes, LRN 143 changed to SR 184, and became a signed route. In 1968, with the opening of SR 178 freeway in Bakersfield, SR 184 was extended northeast, along the old SR 178 alignment to a new connection just east of the old Mesa Marin Raceway. This was where the new alignment for SR 178 ended. This connection was only a temporary connection, because a Morning Drive extension to a new interchange at SR 178 was completed in August 2015. SR 184 is planned to be rerouted onto this new alignment.

Major intersections

See also

References

External links

Caltrans: Route 184 highway conditions
California Highways: Route 184
California @ AARoads.com - State Route 184

184
State Route 184
State Route 184